There are total 20 Member of Parliament from Punjab: 13 in Lok Sabha and 7 in Rajya Sabha.

13 Lok Sabha members are elected from 13 single member constituencies by First past the post voting system. Last election was held on all seats in 2019.

7 Rajya Sabha members are elected by Single transferable vote system by members of Punjab Legislative Assembly. However the elections held at different times and not at same time on all seats. Last elections were held on 5 seats in March 2022 and on 2 seats in June 2016.

Party position

Incumbent members
Following is the list of Member of Parliament of India from Punjab.

Rajya Sabha (7)
Keys:

Lok Sabha (13)
Keys:
,
,
,
,

See also
List of Rajya Sabha members from Punjab

References

Lists of people from Punjab, India
Members of Parliament from Punjab, India